Blues for Salvador is a 1987 album by Carlos Santana, dedicated to his son Salvador. The record was released by Carlos Santana as a solo project, not with the Santana band. It won the 1989 Grammy Award for Best Rock Instrumental Performance, his first Grammy ever.

Track listing
 "Bailando/Aquatic Park" (Carlos Santana, Chester D. Thompson, Orestes Vilató) – 5:46
 "Bella" (Sterling Crew, Santana, Thompson) – 4:31
 "I'm Gone" (Crew, Santana, Thompson) – 3:08
 "'Trane" (Santana) – 3:11
 "Deeper, Dig Deeper" (Crew, Buddy Miles, Santana, Thompson) – 6:09
 "Mingus" (Crew, Santana, Thompson) – 1:26
 "Now That You Know" (Santana) – 10:29
 "Hannibal" (Alex Ligertwood, Alan Pasqua, Raul Rekow) – 4:28
 "Blues for Salvador" (Santana, Thompson) – 5:57

Personnel
 Greg Walker – vocals
 Alex Ligertwood – percussion, vocals
 Carlos Santana – guitar
 Chris Solberg – guitar, vocals
 Chester D. Thompson – keyboards
 Sterling Crew – keyboards, synthesizer
 Orestes Vilató – flute, percussion, timbales, backing vocals
 Alphonso Johnson – bass
 Graham Lear – percussion, drums
 Tony Williams – drums
 Buddy Miles – backing vocals
 Armando Peraza – percussion, bongos, vocals
 Raul Rekow – percussion, conga, vocals, backing vocals

References

1987 albums
Albums produced by Carlos Santana
Carlos Santana albums
CBS Records albums
Grammy Award for Best Rock Instrumental Performance